The 1996 Connecticut Coyotes season was the second of two seasons for the Connecticut Coyotes. They finished the 1996 Arena Football League season 2–12 and were one of four teams in the National Conference to miss the playoffs.

Schedule

Regular season

Standings

References

Connecticut Coyotes seasons
1996 Arena Football League season
Connecticut Coyotes Season, 1996